Neil Joseph Smelser (1930–2017) was an American sociologist who served as professor of sociology at the University of California, Berkeley. He was an active researcher from 1958 to 1994. His research was on collective behavior, sociological theory, economic sociology, sociology of education, social change, and comparative methods. Among many lifetime achievements, Smelser "laid the foundations for economic sociology."

Biography
Smelser was born to a Jewish family, in Kahoka, Missouri, on July 22, 1930. He received his undergraduate degree from Harvard University in 1952 in the Department of Social Relations. From 1952 to 1954, he was a Rhodes scholar at Magdalen College, Oxford, where he studied economics, philosophy, and politics and was awarded a Bachelor of Arts degree. During his first year of graduate school at the age of 24, he co-authored Economy and Society with Talcott Parsons, first published in 1956.

He earned his Doctor of Philosophy degree in sociology from Harvard in 1958, and was a junior fellow of the Society of Fellows. He was given tenure a year after graduating from Harvard and joining Berkeley. and, at the age of 31, he was the youngest editor of the American Sociological Review in 1961, just three years after coming to Berkeley.

He was the fifth director of the Center for Advanced Study in the Behavioral Sciences from 1994 to 2001. He retired in 1994 when he became an emeritus professor and died in Berkeley on October 2, 2017.

Awards and honors
Over his career, Smelser received many prestigious awards and prizes.

1968 American Academy of Arts and Sciences

1993 National Academy of Sciences

1993 Berkeley Citation 

1995 Elected President of American Sociological Association

2000 Ernest W. Burgess Fellow of the American Academy of Political and Social Science.

2002 Mattei Dogan Foundation Prize for Distinguished Career Achievement from the International Sociological Association.

American Philosophical Society

Major works

Theory of Collective Behavior

In Theory of Collective Behavior, Smelser offers a unified theory of collective behavior. It differs from the European social-psychological research on crowd psychology by Gustave Le Bon, Wilfred Trotter, William McDougall, and Sigmund Freud. It also breaks with the American tradition of Edward Alsworth Ross, Robert E. Park, and Herbert Blumer.

As part of his theory, Smelser used the concept of value-added as a metaphor to describe how collective actions occur. Smelser's value added theory (or strain theory) argued that six elements were necessary for a particular kind of collective behavior to emerge:
 Structural conduciveness - things that make or allow certain behaviors possible (e.g. spatial proximity)
 Structural strain - something (inequality, injustice) must strain society
 Generalized belief - explanation; participants have to come to an understanding of what the problem is
 Precipitating factors - spark to ignite the flame
 Mobilization for action - people need to become organized
 Failure of social control - how the authorities react (or don't)

Economic sociology
Smelser was a proponent of economic sociology, an interdisciplinary field that links sociology and economics.

In The Sociology of Economic Life (1963), Smelser defines the field of economic sociology "as the sociological perspective applied to economic phenomena."
Smelser contrasts economic sociology to mainstream economics in terms of (1) their concept of the actor, (2) their concept of economic action, (3) their sense of constraints on Economic Action, (4) their view of the relationship between the economy and society, (5) their goals of analysis, (6) the models they employ, and (7) their intellectual tradition.

Neil J. Smelser and Richard Swedberg's edited volume The Handbook of Economic Sociology (1994; 2nd edition in 2005) is credited with "consolidat[ing] the field of economic sociology."

The comparative method
Smelser wrote some important early works on the comparative method in the social sciences. In Comparative Methods in the Social Sciences (1976), Smelser shows how classic studies of Alexis de Tocqueville, Émile Durkheim, and Max Weber relied on the comparative method.

Smelser's work on the comparative method influenced a key text on the comparative method by Arend Lijphart.

Publications
 Parsons, Talcott, and Neil J. Smelser. 1956. Economy and Society: A Study in the Integration of Economic and Social Theory. London: Routledge.
 Smelser, Neil J. 1959. Social Change in the Industrial Revolution: An Application of Theory to the British Cotton Industry. Chicago: University of Chicago Press.
 Smelser, Neil J. 1962. Theory of Collective Behavior. New York: Free Press.
 Smelser, Neil J. 1963. The Sociology of Economic Life. Englewood Cliffs, N.J., Prentice-Hall.
 Smelser, Neil J.  1968. Essays in Sociological Explanation. Englewood Cliffs, N.J., Prentice-Hall.
 Smelser, Neil J.  1976. Comparative Methods in the Social Sciences. Englewood Cliffs, N.J., Prentice-Hall.
 Smelser, Neil J.  (ed.). 1988. Handbook of sociology. Newbury Park, Calif.: Sage Publications.
 Smelser, Neil J.  1991. Social Paralysis and Social Change: British Working-Class Education in the Nineteenth Century. Berkeley, CA: University of California Press.
 Smelser, Neil J., and Richard Swedberg. (eds.). 1994. The Handbook of Economic Sociology. Princeton, NJ: Princeton University Press.
 Smelser, Neil J.  1998. The Social Edges of Psychoanalysis. Berkeley, CA: University of California Press.
 Smelser, Neil J.  1998. "The Rational and the Ambivalent in the Social Sciences: 1997 Presidential Address". American Sociological Review Vol. 63, No. 1: 1-16.
 Smelser, Neil J., and Paul B. Baltes (eds.). 2001. International Encyclopedia of the Social & Behavioral Sciences, 26 volumes. Amsterdam, Netherlands: Elsevier.
 Smelser, Neil J., and Richard Swedberg. (eds.). 2005. The Handbook of Economic Sociology, Second Edition. Princeton, NJ: Princeton University Press.
 Smelser, Neil J.  2013. Dynamics of the Contemporary University: Growth, Accretion, and Conflict. Berkeley, CA: University of California Press.
 Smelser, Neil J.  2014. Getting Sociology Right: A Half-Century of Reflections. Berkeley, CA: University of California Press.

Resources on Smelser and his research 
 King, Judson, Victoria Bonnell, and Michael Burawoy. 2017. "In Memoriam. Neil Joseph Smelser. University Professor. Professor of Sociology, Emeritus. UC Berkeley, 1930-2017".
 Ormrod, James S. 2014. "Smelser’s Theory of Collective Behaviour", pp. 184–99, in James S. Ormrod, Fantasy and Social Movements. New York, NY: Palgrave Macmillan.
 Smelser, Neil J. 2011-2012. "Neil Smelser: Distinguished Sociologist, University Professor and Servant to the Public." Interviews conducted by Jess McIntosh and Lisa Rubens in 2011-2012.
 Social Science Space. 2017. "The Constant Diplomat: Neil Smelser, 1930-2017."
 Sullivan, T.J., Thompson, K.S. (1986), "Collective Behaviour and Social Change" in Sociology: Concepts, Issues and Applications, Chapter 12. MacMillan, New York.
 Swedberg, Richard, 1990. Economics and Sociology: Redefining Their Boundaries: Conversations with Economists and Sociologists. Princeton; Chapter 11 on Neil Smelser.

References

External links
 Emeritus Faculty profile
Intellectual Odyssey, with Neil Smelser (Conversations with History)(2006)

1930 births
2017 deaths
American sociologists
American Rhodes Scholars
University of California, Berkeley faculty
Harvard University alumni
Presidents of the American Sociological Association
Members of the United States National Academy of Sciences
Foreign Members of the Russian Academy of Sciences
People from Kahoka, Missouri
Center for Advanced Study in the Behavioral Sciences fellows
American Sociological Review editors